Let's Go Navy! is a 1951 comedy film starring The Bowery Boys. The film was released on July 29, 1951 by Monogram Pictures and is the twenty-third film in the series.

Plot
A local charity has raised sixteen hundred dollars and entrusted the boys with it.  They are then robbed of the cash by two men dressed as sailors.  Believing them to be real sailors, and in order to catch them, they enlist in the Navy under fake names.  They spend a year at sea, but cannot locate the thieves.  However, Sach is able to win two thousand dollars gambling and the boys return to the Bowery.  It is there that they are robbed by the same two men, but with the Navy captain helping, they are able to capture the crooks.  They return to the navy office to receive their commendations, but are mistakenly re-enlisted!

Cast

The Bowery Boys
Leo Gorcey as Terrance Aloysius 'Slip' Mahoney
Huntz Hall as Horace Debussy 'Sach' Jones
William Benedict as Whitey
David Gorcey as Chuck
Buddy Gorman as Butch

Remaining cast
Bernard Gorcey as Louie Dumbrowski
Allen Jenkins as Chief Petty Officer Mervin Longnecker
Tom Neal as Joe
Charlita as Princess Papoola
Richard Benedict as Red
Paul Harvey as Lieutenant Commander O. Tannen
Jonathan Hale as Captain
Emory Parnell as Police Sergeant Mulloy
Douglas Evans as Lieutenant Smith
Ray Walker as Lt. Bradley
Frank Jenks as Shell game sailor

Production
This is the final Bowery Boys film to feature Buddy Gorman; beginning with the next film in the series, Bennie Bartlett rejoined the group. It is also the last one produced by Jan Grippo, who left the series after his wife died.

The movie was written by Leonard Stern under the pseudonym Max Adams. After co-writing Ma and Pa Kettle Go to Town with Martin Ragaway, Stern wanted to try his hand at writing a feature on his own. When he finally got the assignment for Let's Go Navy! he adopted the pseudonym because he "wasn't particularly proud of doing a Bowery Boy [film]".

Home media
Warner Archives released the film on made-to-order DVD in the United States as part of "The Bowery Boys, Volume Two" on April 9, 2013.

References

External links

1951 comedy films
1951 films
American black-and-white films
Bowery Boys films
Monogram Pictures films
Military humor in film
Films directed by William Beaudine
American comedy films
1950s English-language films
1950s American films